The 8th (South Canterbury) Mounted Rifles was formed on March 17, 1911. They were mobilised during World War I as a squadron of the Canterbury Mounted Rifles Regiment. They served in the Middle Eastern theatre of World War I and first saw action during the Battle of Gallipoli.
As a part of the larger New Zealand Mounted Rifles Brigade (of the ANZAC Mounted Division) they went on to serve in the Sinai and Palestine Campaign.

Great War Battles
Battle of Gallipoli
Battle of Romani
Battle of Magdhaba
Battle of Rafa
First Battle of Gaza
Second Battle of Gaza
Third Battle of Gaza
Battle of Beersheba
Battle of Megiddo (1918)

Between the Wars
In 1921 they amalgamated with the 1st Mounted Rifles (Canterbury Yeomanry Cavalry) and became the 1st New Zealand Mounted Rifles (Canterbury Yeomanry Cavalry).

References

History of Canterbury, New Zealand
Military units and formations established in 1911
Military units and formations disestablished in 1921
Cavalry regiments of New Zealand
Military units and formations of New Zealand in World War I
New Zealand in World War I
1911 establishments in New Zealand